Macedonia is scheduled to compete at the 2017 World Aquatics Championships in Budapest, Hungary from 14 July to 30 July.

Open water swimming

Macedonia has entered one open water swimmer

Swimming

Macedonia has received a Universality invitation from FINA to send a female swimmer to the World Championships.

References

World Aquatics Championships
Nations at the 2017 World Aquatics Championships
2017